IODP may refer to:
 International Ocean Discovery Program, a marine research program that began in 2013
 Integrated Ocean Drilling Program, a marine research program between 2003 and 2013